A Mongolian passport is a document which authorises and facilitates travel and other activities in Mongolia or by Mongolian citizens.

In medieval times, the Mongol Empire issued passports (gerege) to officials and emissaries.  This authorised them to claim facilities for travel throughout the empire using the yam (Örtöö) system of relay stations which provided food and remounts.

Nowadays, all Mongolian citizens are required to register and apply for a civil passport (now called a civil ID card) within 30 days of reaching the age of 16.  This is a form of identity document for these often nomadic people.

Foreign travel passports are issued to citizens of Mongolia for international travel.  New Mongolian passports are issued by the Ministry of Foreign Affairs (MFA) in Ulaanbaatar or at Mongolian Embassies worldwide.

Types of passports

Ordinary passport (red), Engiin passport
Official passport (green), Alban passport
Diplomatic passport (blue), Diplomat passport

Design

The inside cover of the passport is written in Cyrillic Mongolian and in English. Previously, however, traditional Mongolian characters were used on the cover. The first page inscription is as follows:

Энэхүү паспортыг эзэмшигч Монгол Улсын иргэнийг ямар нэгэн саадгүйгээр чөлөөтэй нэврүүлж, шаардлагатай үед түүнийг хамгаалан бүх талын туслалцаа үзүүлэхийг холбогдох эрхэм этгээдээс Монгол Улсын Гадаад харилцааны сайд хичээнгүйлэн хүсч байна. 

English Translation: The Minister for External Relations of Mongolia requests all those whom it may concern to allow the bearer, a citizen of Mongolia, to pass freely and without hindrance and in case of need to afford him or her every assistance and protection.

Visa requirements

In 2016, Mongolian citizens had visa-free or visa on arrival access to 58 countries and territories, ranking the Mongolian passport 81st in the world according to the Visa Restrictions Index.

See also
Mongolian nationality law
 Visa requirements for Mongolian citizens

References

Passports by country
Government of Mongolia